Spiritus Progenitum is an international humanitarian arts and literary festival held annually in Sarajevo, Bosnia and Herzegovina. It exclusively showcases art and literature from the Former Yugoslavia.

References

Recurring events established in 2013
December events
Tourist attractions in Sarajevo
Annual events in Bosnia and Herzegovina
Art festivals
Festivals in Sarajevo
2013 establishments in Bosnia and Herzegovina